The giurgiulena (also known as giuggiulena, cubaita or cumpittu) is a traditional Christmas  nougat-like candy, typical of the Sicilian cuisine and in use in a large part of Calabria.

The main ingredient is sesame, which in Sicily and in Calabria is precisely indicated by the terms giuggiulena, gigiolena, giuggiulea or ciciulena.  The recipe is based on the composition of sesame seeds poured in honey and fixed by the caramelization of sugar (in an enriched version almonds and candied orange peel are also added), in the way of nougat.

It takes very long to prepare, with a rest period of twenty-four hours. The giurgiulena is usually cut into diamonds or rectangles, sometimes sprinkled with colorful confetti and individually wrapped, sometimes above aromatic orange leaves. As with many other Sicilian and Calabrian pastries, giuggiulena is considered a legacy of the Arab pastry. The name derives from Arab juljulàn (or giolgiolan). The alternative name cubaita derives instead from the Arab term qubayt (also spelled qubait and qubbayt).

See also

 Italian cuisine
 Sicilian cuisine  
 List of Sicilian dishes

References

Cuisine of Sicily
Italian confectionery
Cuisine of Calabria
Italian desserts